Ma Jiliang (7 May 1914 – 23 August 1988), born Ma Jizong and better known by his pen name Tang Na, also known as Ma Shaoliang, was a Chinese writer. He was the second husband of actress Jiang Qing, who after their divorce married Mao Zedong.

References

1914 births
1988 deaths